Peter Robert Bissell (11 March 1986, in Stevenage, Hertfordshire – 29 December 2007) was an English road and track racing cyclist, who died aged 21. In 2006 he was the British under-23 road race champion.

Bissell began cycling aged 11 in 1997, joining the Welwyn Wheelers the following year. He attended The Nobel School in Stevenage from 1997 to 2001. Bissell began to take the sport more seriously in 2000, coming second in the under-14 omnium at the national track championships. 

After success as a juvenile and junior, he was awarded the Chris Boardman Trophy in 2005. He then raced in France with Albert Bigot 79,(2005 and 2006) and VS Quimper (2007). Bissell was supported by the Dave Rayner Fund in 2006 and 2007. He was due to return to France in 2008 to become a professional with the Hennebont team but died after his heart stopped on a night out with friends. 

His sister, Laura Bissell is also a successful cyclist.

Palmarès

2000
2nd British National Track Championships, Under 14 Omnium
2002
3rd Pursuit, British National Track Championships, Under 16
3rd 500m TT, British National Track Championships, Under 16
2004
Joint 1st British National 10 Time Trial Championships, Junior
1st British National Hill Climb Championships
2nd British National 25 Time Trial Championships, Junior
2005
1st la Voide
1st Bazoges en Pailliers
2006
1st  British National Road Race Championships, Under 23 (Espoirs)
2007
1st routes du Scorff
1st Quimper
2nd Blois

References

External links
British Cycling Under 23 (Espoirs) Road Race Championships 2006
Welwyn Wheelers, Bissells first club

1986 births
2007 deaths
English male cyclists
People from Stevenage
Sportspeople from Hertfordshire